Gretel "Greti" Oberhollenzer-Rogger, née Rogger (born 1958), is an Italian ski mountaineer. She and her husband are dairymen of the Rifugio Pian di Cengia aka Büllelejochhütte near Sexten.

Selected results 
 2003:
 4th, Pierra Menta (together with Astrid Renzler)
 2004:
 1st, Dolomiti Cup team (together with Astrid Renzler)
 2nd, World Cup team (together with Astrid Renzler)
 7th, World Championship team race (together with Astrid Renzler)

References 

1958 births
Living people
Italian female ski mountaineers
People from Sexten